Ay Lav Yu is a 2010 Turkish comedy film, written and directed by Sermiyan Midyat, about a young man who having completed his education returns to his home village along with his American bride-to-be.

Production
Filming took place from 14 July to 10 August 2009 on location in Hasankeyf, Nurlu, Izbirak and Istanbul, Turkey.

Plot
Yusuf Ağa, the landlord of the tiny southeast Anatolian village of Tinne, keeps sending petitions to high level state officials to make the voice of his village heard by the central government. Years ago, Yusuf abandoned his son, İbrahim, in the courtyard of a university so that he could get a good education and become an important man. There, İbrahim was found by Father Hana, who raised him and gave him a good life. Now İbrahim has turned 30, and he returns to his village along with his girlfriend, Jessica. But will the tiny village of Tinne become the new home of İbrahim and Jessica?
SYNOPSIS
In a forgotten part of the Earth, in a deserted land in this forgotten part, is a simple and lonely village 'Tinne'. Almost no one knows about its existence, except the beaming Sun maybe.

This land is Tinne, that doesn't even exist on the national map, that has no school, roadway or clinic. No dweller has identification paper over there. 'Existence' or 'nonexistence' is the one and only question. Its destiny may as well be the victim of its name's definition in Kurdish language, which means 'non-existent'.

Tinne, a village abandoned to its own destiny in the middle of Mesopotamia, in the Southeast of Turkey, has been intentionally or unintentionally 'forgotten' by the government for years. Its inhabitants don't even have any record in the civil registry. Neither Tinne, nor any of its people exist officially, whereas Yusuf Agha and its whole family have been living in this land for over a century.

Even though Yusuf Agha constantly tries to get in touch with the government, he cannot get a reply to any of his letters. Hoping that his son will get a certificate of identification, he decides to leave his newborn son Ibrahim in the courtyard of the college while many others leave theirs in the mosque's courtyard. Luckily, Priest Hanna who happens to pass by there comes to Ibrahim's rescue. He adopts him so that he has identification, so that he exists, and by his existence, makes Tinne finally exist.

Now-30-year-old Ibrahim returns to his homeland having finished his military service and graduated from college. He is enthusiastically and joyfully welcomed in the village. The only hope for Tinne, the village's unique source of pride is back, bringing with him the chance for Tinne to start to exist, to become wealthy, to have a school, a roadway, a clinic and to become modern.

However, Ibrahim's heart is left in far away lands. Even though the facts that he received his college degree, that he finished his military service and that he is in love with a girl are greeted with happiness, this whole picture turns into a complete shock with Yusuf Agha hearing the girl's name: Jessica. So, where is this Jessica from? What family does she belong to? Ibrahim answers: Colorado! The family is completely bewildered. Kolarado???

Ibrahim, while studying fishery engineering at the University of Çukurova, met Jessica who worked as an interpreter in America's military base in Incirlik-Adana and he quickly fell in love with her. She became the reason of his life, so he did for her. They both had a hard time trying to convince their families.

For Ibrahim's family, it is a major issue to travel to the United States from Tinne, considering that they don't even have identification cards. Finally, Jessica manages to take her father Christopher, her mother Pamela and her brother Danny to Tinne. This is the arrival of America to Tinne, which is not heard of, seen or known by the Turkish government.

After this moment, everything becomes a reason for bewilderment and confusion, one after the other. Different cultures, different traditions, different civilizations and different philosophies of life...

Cast
Sermiyan Midyat as İbrahim
Katie Gill as Jessica
Steve Guttenberg as Christopher
Mariel Hemingway as Pamela
Meray Ülgen as Yusuf
Ayşe Nil Şamlıoğlu as Xate
Fadik Sevin Atasoy as Zisan
Josh Folan as Danny
Ayça Damgacı as Fehime
Erdoğan Tuncel as Ubeyd
Cengiz Bozkurt as Saido
Şener Kökkaya as Behcet
Nazlı Tosunoğlu as Gule
Nihal Yalçın as Rukiye
Muhammed Cangören as Papaz Hanna
Halil İbrahim Babur as Faruk
Bahar Ün as Sultan
Sinan Dağ as Aliko
Local people of Midyat.

Release

Reception

Box office
The film has made a total gross of $1,128,315.

Reviews
Emrah Güler, writing for Hürriyet Daily News, describes the film as, a comedy on cultural differences between the residents of a remote village and Americans with a newfound paranoia of Muslims after 9/11, which is the latest in a string of movies reflecting the government's Kurdish initiative. Though the movie sets out to break prejudices, he continues, its primitive jokes play on – and at times perpetuate – these stereotypes about cultural differences, as The four languages spoken in – and boasted about in hype for – the film basically become the backbone of the movie, providing silly jokes about miscommunications. He recommends the film to, Those who would like to see how a director from Turkey perceives Islamophobia by Americans, but concludes that, in the end, though "Ay Lav Yu" claims to celebrate diversity, it becomes all the more dangerous for making light of it.

A review in Didim Today states that you should see it because, The talented Sermiyan Midyat is writer, director and star of this culture-clash comedy from Turkey, and compares it favourably to Bride and Prejudice, A Good Year and My Life in Ruins.

References

External links
  for the film
 
 

2010 films
2010s Turkish-language films
2010 comedy films
Films set in Turkey
Turkish comedy films